Phil Judd (born 1948) is an Australian sound engineer, managing director of PhilmSound Pty. Ltd., who is credited with post-production work on many well-known (mostly Australian) movies and several television series. He is not related to the New Zealand musician Phil Judd.

History
Judd began his audio engineering career in 1964 at the broadcast studios of 2GB in Sydney as a sound booth panel operator, then in 1967 joined Fauna Productions who were employing production crew for the television series Skippy the Bush Kangaroo, for which incidentally he provided the trademark "tch-tch" voice of "Skippy".

Around 1970 he joined Artransa Film Studios, for whom he mixed his first feature film, The Adventures of Barry McKenzie (1972); another notable film of this period of his life was Peter Weir's The Last Wave, for which he won an AFI award in 1977, after which his name was associated with a great number of Australian movies and TV mini-series. His name has been associated with Peter Weir on many projects.

In 1991 he founded his own company PhilmSound with extensive facilities at Lindfield, New South Wales.

Some movie credits

Memberships
Audio Engineering Society
Motion Picture Sound Editors (US)
Australian Film Institute (Pre-selection Judge)
Australian Screen Sound Guild Inc. (and founding president)

References

External links 
 PhilmSound website
 

1948 births
Australian audio engineers
Living people